Malence is a settlement on the left bank of the Krka River in the Municipality of Kostanjevica na Krki in eastern Slovenia. The area is part of the traditional region of Lower Carniola. It is now included in the Lower Sava Statistical Region.

There is a memorial to 25 locals from Kostanjevica that were executed on the spot on 21 October 1943 by German forces during World War II.

References

External links

Malence on Geopedia

Populated places in the Municipality of Kostanjevica na Krki